The North Carolina Religious Coalition for Marriage Equality (also known as NCRC4ME) was an interfaith same-sex marriage advocacy group composed of religious leaders in North Carolina. The group's headquarters were at Pullen Memorial Baptist Church in Raleigh which has hosted speeches with James A. Forbes of the Riverside Church in regards to LGBT rights. The steering committee included executive director Jimmy Creech, group coordinator Chantelle Fisher-Borne, Mary E. Grigolia of the Eno River Unitarian Universalist Fellowship, Jack McKinney of Pullen Memorial Baptist Church, Susan Parker of Wake Forest Baptist Church, Steve Smith of the North Carolina Council of Churches, and Wanda Floyd of the Imani Metropolitan Community Church.
 
In 2004, NCR4ME issued a statement calling for equality of same-sex and opposite-sex marriage,  signed by North Carolina religious leaders.

See also

 LGBT-affirming churches
 North Carolina Amendment 1
 Religion and homosexuality
 Same-sex marriage in North Carolina

References

External links
 Gay marriage now legal in North Carolina
 U.S. District Judge Max Cogburn's ruling on gay marriage

Defunct LGBT organizations in the United States
LGBT and religion
LGBT political advocacy groups in North Carolina
Organizations based in Raleigh, North Carolina
Organizations established in 2004
Religion in North Carolina
Same-sex marriage in the United States